This is a timeline of events in the War in Somalia (2009–present).

Incumbents 
 President: Farmajo
 Prime Minister: Abdi Farah Shirdon (until 21 December), Abdiweli Sheikh Ahmed (starting 21 December)

See also
Somali Civil War (2009–present)
2013 timeline of the War in Somalia

References

 
Somalia
2010s in Somalia
Years of the 21st century in Somalia
Somalia